Killer Sofa is a 2019 low-budget direct-to-DVD New Zealand comedy horror film written, directed and produced by Bernie Rao. Starring Piimio Mei, Nathalie Morris, Harley Neville, Stacey King, Jed Brophy, Jim Baltaxe (who also served as production manager) and Grant Kereama, the plot concerns a living recliner that commits crimes in the name of passion for its new owner. The film was released on DVD on 1 October 2019 by the US-based distributor High Octane Pictures, and received mixed reviews from critics, but reception for its humour was overall positive.

Synopsis 
Jack, a disgraced Rabbi, comes across a reclining chair containing a dybbuk inside. After the recliner is sold to Francesca, Jack, alongside his voodoo sorceress partner, must try to find out where it was delivered. Meanwhile, the recliner becomes obsessed with Francesca and starts murdering anyone who gets close to her out of jealousy due to a previous relationship.

Production 
The recliner cost NZ$100. The initial title of the film was planned to be My Lover, My Lazy Boy, but the production feared being sued by the La-Z-Boy furniture company. After this, the title The Furnishing was then considered, but finally the name Killer Sofa was chosen.

Rao faced some limitations while filming as he only had one recliner, which meant he was unable to film the sofa jumping from a window and crushing a person on a car, or a scene of the sofa vomiting blood as he worried it would stain the suede on the recliner.

Release 
The film was released on DVD on 1 October 2019 by the US-based distributor High Octane Pictures, before arriving to video-on-demand.

Reception 
The film received mixed reviews from critics, but reception for its humour was overall positive.

Matt Donato, writing for Flickering Myth, gave the film three out of four stars, saying: "Killer Sofa is weird, sometimes unwieldy, but should delight those who giggled incessantly at the film’s properly conveyed trailer."

In a less positive review, Mike Phalin of Sciencefiction.com gave the film a 2.5 out of five, saying: "For a quick bit of wacky horror with a twist ending, Killer Sofa delivers on that end. Had the story and some key characters gotten a bit of tidying up in the script process, this could have been much more fun."

See also 
Death Bed: The Bed That Eats
The Refrigerator
Amityville 4: The Evil Escapes, featuring a killer lamp
Amityville: It's About Time, featuring a killer clock

References

External links 

2019 films
2019 horror films
2019 comedy horror films
New Zealand comedy horror films
2010s New Zealand films
2010s English-language films